The Best Band You Never Heard in Your Life is a double-disc live album by American musician Frank Zappa, released in 1991. The album was one of four to be recorded during the 1988 world tour, along with Broadway the Hard Way, Make a Jazz Noise Here, and posthumously in 2021, Zappa '88: The Last U.S. Show. Each of the first three accounts of the 1988 tour has a different emphasis: Broadway the Hard Way mainly consists of new compositions; Make a Jazz Noise Here is a sampler of classic Zappa tunes, most of them instrumental; and The Best Band... devotes itself to covers. Some of these are unlikely (such as "Stairway to Heaven" by Led Zeppelin), while many are from Zappa's extensive back catalogue. His mid-1970s output is emphasized in the selection, but there is also some material from the Mothers of Invention's late 1960s recordings and one song ("Lonesome Cowboy Burt") from 200 Motels. It was re-issued in 1995 and 2012 along with his entire catalogue.

The album is also notable for its extended section of potshots against American Pentecostal televangelist Jimmy Swaggart, who had then just confessed to transgressions with a prostitute on live television; the speech was later dubbed his "I have sinned" speech. "Lonesome Cowboy Burt", "More Trouble Every Day" and "Penguin in Bondage" feature entirely rewritten lyrics to capitalize on and satirize the scandal.

Cover artwork 
The original album simply featured a photograph of Frank Zappa and his band against a black background with blue lettering, but upon discovering that the photograph had been used without the permission of the photographer, Bruce Malone, Zappa simply continued issuing the cover with the photograph replaced with an empty black space. When the album was reissued and remastered in 1995, it featured artwork by long-time Zappa artist Cal Schenkel that had been created for the album's original Japanese release. The Japanese kanji at the top of the sign on this version do not together form any meaningful sentence to a speaker of Japanese, but can be read with the on readings of fu-ran-ku-za-pa, an approximation of Frank Zappa in Japanese sounds. In addition, Schenkel used characters from his artwork on the cover of Zappa's 1972 release The Grand Wazoo, such as Stu (AKA Uncle Meat), as well as a man from the playing a Mystery Horn. In addition there is a red sofa, that while not an exact duplicate, is reminiscent of the red sofa from his art on Zappa's 1975 One Size Fits All.  In 2012, when the album was reissued again, it returned the cover to the version featuring a blank space in place of the photograph.

Track listing 
All tracks by Frank Zappa, except where noted. The European re-releases of this album omit "Bolero" due to an objection from the rights-holders of the piece.

Personnel

Musicians 
 Frank Zappa – lead guitar, computer-synth, vocal
 Ike Willis – rhythm guitar, synth, vocal
 Mike Keneally – rhythm guitar, synth, vocal
 Bobby Martin – keyboards, vocal
 Ed Mann – vibes, marimba, electronic percussion
 Walt Fowler – trumpet, flugel horn, synth
 Bruce Fowler – trombone
 Paul Carman – alto sax, soprano sax, baritone sax
 Albert Wing – tenor saxophone
 Kurt McGettrick – baritone sax, bass sax, contrabass clarinet
 Scott Thunes – electric bass, Mini-moog
 Chad Wackerman – drums, electronic percussion

Production 
 Frank Zappa – production, arranging, compilation, editing
 Bob Stone – engineering

References

External links 
 Release details

Frank Zappa live albums
1991 live albums
Capitol Records live albums